Issa Schultz (born 1 March 1984) is an English-born Australian television quiz personality best known for being one of the "chasers" on The Chase Australia, where he is nicknamed "The Supernerd".

In addition to his current role on The Chase Australia, Schultz is also a nine-time winner of the Australian Quizzing Championships (2011, 2013, 2014, 2016, 2017, 2018, 2020, 2021, 2022) and seven-time Pairs champion (2012–17, 2020). He also appeared on The Rich List, where he won $200,000 in 2009, as well as Who Wants to Be a Millionaire? and The Einstein Factor.

His name Issa is an Arabic version of the name "Jesus", which he was named after a best friend of his parents when they worked in Qatar in the 1970s. Schultz and his family moved to Australia from Britain in 1995. They settled in Tewantin, Queensland and Schultz attended Noosa District State High School. He was one of the four school captains in 2001.

In 2017, Schultz appeared as a celebrity contestant on Hell's Kitchen Australia.

Schultz placed 23rd in the 2020 World Quizzing Championships.

In March 2022 it was announced that Schultz would stand in for Anne Hegerty in ITV's Beat the Chasers after she tested positive for COVID-19.

References

External links

1984 births
People from Brisbane
Australian television people
Australian expatriates in England
People from St Austell
Living people
Contestants on Australian game shows
English emigrants to Australia